To Them – To Us is an album of solo piano performances by the American jazz pianist Jaki Byard recorded in 1981 and released on the Italian Soul Note label.

Reception
The Allmusic review by Ken Dryden awarded the album 4 stars stating "Jaki Byard was captured alone in a Milan studio for this delightful session. As usual, he displays his formidable technique with an ever-present twinkle of humor. Everything from early jazz to classic renditions of Ellington masterpieces... Several strong Byard originals round out this highly recommended CD".

Track listing
All compositions by Jaki Byard except as indicated
 "To Them - To Us" - 11:23 
 "BL + WH = 88" - 3:04 
 "Tin Roof Blues" (George Brunies, Paul Mares, Ben Pollack, Leon Roppolo, Mel Stitzel) - 3:40 
 "Land of Make Believe" (Chuck Mangione) - 3:32 
 "Solitude" (Eddie DeLange, Duke Ellington, Irving Mills) - 4:30 
 "Caravan" (Juan Tizol) - 3:24 
 "Ode to Billie Joe" (Bobbi Gentry) - 5:30 
 "Send One Your Love" (Stevie Wonder) - 4:17 
 "Excerpts from Trumpet Concerto: Calm of the Sea/Approaching Winds/Calm" - 4:36
Recorded at Barigozzi Studio in Milano, Italy on May 27, 1981

Personnel
Jaki Byard – piano

References

Black Saint/Soul Note albums
Jaki Byard albums
Instrumental albums
1981 albums
Solo piano jazz albums